Ridgeway View is a hamlet  south of the village of Chiseldon near Swindon, situated in the county of Wiltshire, England.

During World War I a large hutted army camp was built to the east of Draycot Foliat; from 1930 there was a small station on the Swindon to Marlborough line, called Chiseldon Camp Halt. In World War II the area housed British and American troops, and around 1963, after the army left, the married quarters became residential housing, later named Ridgeway View.

Ridgeway View falls within the civil parish of Chiseldon.

Leicester Tigers and England winger Jonny May was born, and grew up in, Ridgeway View.

References

Hamlets in Wiltshire